Clifford Geoffrey Hall (19 January 1902 – 9 July 1982) was an English first-class cricketer. He was a right-handed batsman who made his debut for Hampshire against Middlesex in the 1933 County Championship, making just the single appearance in the season.

Hall played his second first-class match for Hampshire in the 1935 County Championship, playing four matches during the season. Hall's final first-class appearance for the club came against Glamorgan. In his five matches Hall scored 77 runs at an average of 11.00, with a high score of 37.

Hall died at Breamore, Hampshire on 9 July 1982.

External links
Clifford Hall at Cricinfo
Clifford Hall at CricketArchive

1902 births
1982 deaths
People from New Forest District
English cricketers
Hampshire cricketers